Forth House is a historic home located at Livingston in Columbia County, New York. It was built between 1835 and 1840 and is a large, classically proportioned hipped roof structure in the Greek Revival style. It was the last major high-style, sophisticated masonry dwelling built for the Livingston family.

It was listed on the National Register of Historic Places in 2010.

References

External links
The Classicist Blog: An Extraordinary Excursion Along the Hudson River Valley, Part 2

Houses on the National Register of Historic Places in New York (state)
Greek Revival houses in New York (state)
Houses completed in 1840
Houses in Columbia County, New York
National Register of Historic Places in Columbia County, New York